Tākaka is a town in New Zealand's Golden Bay. It may also refer to:

In New Zealand
 Takaka County, a former administrative body
 Tākaka Hill, the southern boundary of Golden Bay
 Tākaka River, the main river through the New Zealand town
 Takaka Terrane, a geological feature

Elsewhere
 Takaka, Afghanistan